Hamilton Pierre Matt "Tony" Milton  (born 22 March 1938) is a retired British swimmer. His team finished fourth in the 4×200 m freestyle relay at the 1960 Summer Olympics setting a new European record.

Milton was educated at Bedford Modern School.  Three of his relatives competed at the 1936 Summer Olympics: his uncle Bob Pirie and mother Irene Pirie-Milton were Canadian swimmers, and his father Frederick Milton was a British water polo player.

References

1938 births
People educated at Bedford Modern School
Living people
Swimmers at the 1960 Summer Olympics
Olympic swimmers of Great Britain
English male freestyle swimmers
Sportspeople from London
British people of Canadian descent